Wutha-Farnroda is a municipality in the Wartburgkreis district of Thuringia, Germany.

Wutha station is located on the Halle–Bebra railway.

Population development 

1994: 8.770
2000: 7.794
2004: 7.405
2010: 6.560
2014: 6.360

References

External links
 

Wartburgkreis
Grand Duchy of Saxe-Weimar-Eisenach